Uri Orlev (24 February 1931 – 25 July 2022)  born Jerzy Henryk Orłowski, was a Polish-born Israeli children's author and translator. He received the Hans Christian Andersen Award in 1996 for his "lasting contribution to children's literature", the Prime Minister’s Prize for Hebrew Literary Works in 1972 and the Bialik Prize for literature in 2006.

Biography
Uri Orlev was born in 1931 in Warsaw, Poland, the son of a physician. During World War II, his father was taken captive by the Russians and he lived with his mother in the Warsaw Ghetto until she was killed by the Nazis. A relative hid him and his brother in the ghetto until he was caught by the Germans and deported to the Bergen-Belsen concentration camp in 1943. As a prisoner in Bergen-Belsen, he wrote and recited poetry which would later be published by Yad Vashem in 2005. He survived the Holocaust and was liberated by the British Army in 1945. He and his brother emigrated to Israel and were placed in kibbutz Ginegar. They were joined by their father in 1954. After finishing high school on the kibbutz, Orlev served in the Israel Defense Forces as an infantryman. Upon completing his regular military service, Orlev returned to the kibbutz and began working in the cowsheds. He continued to serve as a reservist and subsequently fought in the Suez Crisis, Six-Day War, and Yom Kippur War.

While living and working at Ginegar, Orlev began imagining short stories. He typically spent his weekends traveling to and from Haifa to watch movies there along with a German-born kibbutznik named Shlomo. During their bus rides, Orlev would tell his stories to Shlomo, who urged him to write them down. After writing a rough draft, Orlev was granted permission by the kibbutz to spend a year with the family of Eliyahu Soloveitchik, a man he'd met in Bergen-Belsen who was living near Haifa. While there, he continued writing his manuscript, which would become his book The Lead Soldiers. He returned to Ginegar where he resumed his work in the cowsheds, and had the book published in 1956.

In 1968, Orlev and his family moved to the Yemin Moshe neighborhood of Jerusalem. He began writing children's literature as a profession and ended up publishing over 30 books, which are often biographical, about his childhood during the Holocaust or his early years in Israel, and from an accessible perspective for children. His books have been translated from Hebrew into 36 languages. Among his more famous works are Run, Boy, Run, The Island on Bird Street and The Lead Soldiers.

He was also a translator of Polish literature into Hebrew, such as Quo Vadis by Henryk Sienkiewicz. 

Orlev appeared in the documentary film "Life is Strange" where he was interviewed about his books and his life before World War II.

Orlev was twice married and had two sons, a daughter, and four grandchildren. One of his sons, Itamar Orlev, is also a writer and made his debut with the novel Bandit in 2015.

He died on 26 July 2022.

Awards and critical acclaim

The biennial Hans Christian Andersen Award conferred by the International Board on Books for Young People is the highest recognition available to a writer or illustrator of children's books. Orlev received the writing award in 1996. The jury stated:

In 1972, he received the Prime Minister's Prize for Hebrew Literary Works. In 2006, he was awarded the Bialik Prize for literature (jointly with Ruth Almog and Raquel Chalfi).

In the U.S., four books by Orlev have won the Batchelder Award in English-language translations by Hillel Halkin published by Houghton Mifflin. The annual American Library Association award recognizes the "children's book considered to be the most outstanding of those books originally published in a foreign language in a foreign country, and subsequently translated into English and published in the United States". The four American titles were The Island on Bird Street, The Man from the Other Side, The Lady with the Hat, and Run, Boy, Run, published from 1984 to 2003 by Houghton Mifflin, eventually by its Walter Lorraine Books imprint.

Published works

Awards 

 1992: National Jewish Book Award for The Man From the Other Side

References

External links

 Biography & Bibliography from the Institute for the Translation of Hebrew Literature

1931 births
2022 deaths
Israeli children's writers
Israeli Jews
Polish children's writers
Polish emigrants to Israel
Polish male writers
Israeli people of Polish-Jewish descent
Writers from Warsaw
Hans Christian Andersen Award for Writing winners
Warsaw Ghetto inmates
Bergen-Belsen concentration camp survivors
Recipients of Prime Minister's Prize for Hebrew Literary Works